See Girl Run is a 2012 American comedy film written and directed by Nate Meyer. The film stars Robin Tunney, Adam Scott, Jeremy Strong, William Sadler, Aubrey Dollar, Marylouise Burke and Josh Hamilton. The film was released on April 26, 2013, by Phase 4 Films.

Cast
Robin Tunney as Emmie
Adam Scott as Jason
Jeremy Strong as Brandon
William Sadler as Marty
Aubrey Dollar as Becky
Marylouise Burke as Grandma
Josh Hamilton as Graham
Maureen Butler as Gail
Larry Pine as Jason's Father
J.P. Guimont as Kyle 
Meagan Moses as Tami
Stephanie Andujar as Alicia
Reza Salazar as Denilo
Charles Techman as Jack
Miles Doleac as Del

Release
The film premiered at South by Southwest on March 11, 2012. The film was released on April 26, 2013, by Phase 4 Films.

References

External links
 

2012 films
2012 comedy films
American comedy films
2010s English-language films
2010s American films